View synthesis aims to create new views of a specific subject starting from a number of pictures taken from given point of views.

Currently a study branch of Computer Science Research, Vision Research and Artificial Intelligence fields are involved in the definition of suitable approaches to the problem. See Computer Vision

Example problem 1: Is to take a number of images of a specific subject, taken from a specific point with a specific camera orientation and setting, and then use that data to build a synthetic image that looks as if it was taken from a virtual camera that is placed at a different point and with the same settings.

Example problem 2: Two people interact through their computers, using a webcam. Try to render corrected images, as if taken from a virtual webcam positioned behind the application window. 
This would solve the long-standing Eye contact problem which is experienced in this environment. A double illusion is perceived by the users: each of them looks at each other's face, but neither of them get the proper feeling of it.

An example application of view synthesis is Free viewpoint television.

See also 
 3D reconstruction from multiple images
 Image-based modeling and rendering
 Image synthesis

External links 
 
 
 
http://news.bbc.co.uk/1/hi/technology/3833831.stm
https://web.archive.org/web/20060905013927/http://www.cs.wisc.edu/computer-vision/projects/interp/interp.html
http://homepages.inf.ed.ac.uk/rbf/CVonline/LOCAL_COPIES/FUSIELLO4/tutorial.html#x1-10001
https://web.archive.org/web/20061126225514/http://www-sop.inria.fr/robotvis/personnel/fabad/PhD/index.html
http://www.cs.huji.ac.il/labs/vision/demos/synthesis/synthesis.html
http://www.hpl.hp.com/research/mmsl/projects/graphics/chromaglyph/index.html

Computer graphics
Applications of computer vision
3D imaging